Innarahu is a small, uninhabited Baltic Sea islet belonging to Estonia.

Innarahu is a protected island belonging to Vilsandi National Park, off the western coast of the larger island of Saaremaa.

The island is a calving ground for Baltic grey seals (Halichoerus grypus).

References

External links
Ecotourism Estonia: Vilsandi National Park 
Keskkonnainfo: Eelis Infoleht  (in Estonian)
Anni Turismitalu - Päikesepaistelisem koht Eestimaal (in Estonian)

Estonian islands in the Baltic
Saaremaa Parish
Uninhabited islands of Estonia